The history of coffee dates back across centuries of old oral tradition.  Coffee plants grew wild in Yemen and were widely used by nomadic tribes for thousands of years. Sufi monasteries in Yemen employed coffee as an aid to concentration during prayers. Roasting the seeds was not a way to serve coffee until the 1400s.[1] During the cultivation, brewed coffee was reserved exclusively for the priesthood and the medical profession; doctors would use the brew for patients experiencing a need for better digestion, and priests used it to stay alert during their long nights of studying for the church. Coffee later spread to Europe in the early 16th century; it caused some controversy on whether it was halal in Ottoman and Mamluk society. Coffee arrived in Italy the second half of the 16th century through commercial Mediterranean trade routes, only being served to the wealthy. Central and Eastern Europeans learned of coffee from the Ottomans. By the mid 17th century, it had reached India and the East Indies.

Coffee houses would establish themselves in Western Europe by the late 17th century, especially in England and Germany. In many cultures, if you could afford to serve coffee to your guests, it was a sign of wealth and power. One of the earliest cultivations of coffee in the New World was when Gabriel de Clieu brought coffee seedlings to Martinique in 1720. These beans later sprouted 18,680 coffee trees which enabled its spread to other Caribbean islands like Saint-Domingue and also to Mexico. By 1788, Saint-Domingue supplied half the world's coffee. 

By 1852, globally, Brazil became the largest producer of coffee and has held that status ever since. The period since 1950 saw the widening of the playing field due to the emergence of several other major producers, notably Colombia, Ivory Coast, Ethiopia, and Vietnam; the latter overtook Colombia and became the second-largest producer in 1999.[2] Modern production techniques along with the mass production of coffee has made it a household item today. It is a similar story with cocoa, tea, potatoes, tomatoes, maize, peas and beans.

Etymology 
The word coffee entered the English language in 1582 via the Dutch , borrowed from the Ottoman Turkish , borrowed in turn from the Arabic . Medieval Arab lexicographers traditionally held that the etymology of  meant 'wine', given its distinctly dark color, and derived from the verb , 'to have no appetite'. The word  most likely meant 'the dark one', referring to the brew or the bean;  is not the name of the bean, which are known in Arabic as bunn and in Cushitic languages as būn. Semitic languages had the root qhh, "dark color", which became a natural designation for the beverage. There is no evidence that the word  was named after the Ethiopian province of Kaffa (a part of where coffee originates from: Abyssinia), or any significant authority stating the opposite, or that it is traced to the Arabic  ("power").
Kahve in Turkish is word borrowed from Persian word, Qahve قهوه ای, so it means something in Brown colour. Persian land or Iran was in the way of silk road and business path of coffee beans to Turkey and Europe.
The terms coffee pot and coffee break originated in 1705 and 1952 respectively.

Genetics
Studies of genetic diversity have been performed on Coffea arabica varieties, which were found to be of low diversity but with retention of some residual heterozygosity from ancestral materials, and closely related diploid species Coffea canephora and C. liberica; however, no direct evidence has ever been found indicating where in Africa coffee grew or who among the local people might have used it as a stimulant or known about it there earlier than the seventeenth century. The original domesticated coffee plant is said to have been from Harar, and the native population is thought to be derived from Ethiopia with distinct nearby populations in Sudan and Kenya.

History
 

Coffee grown and exploited worldwide can be traced back to centuries to the Ethiopian plateau of ancient coffee forests. There is a legend that states a goat herder Kaldi was the first to discover the coffee bean. As word was spread from the east, it reached all the way to the Arabian peninsula. Evidence of knowledge of the coffee tree and coffee drinking first appeared in the late 15th century; Sufi Imam Muhammad Ibn Said Al Dhabhani is known to have imported goods from Ethiopia to Yemen.
Coffee was first exported out of Ethiopia to Yemen by Somali merchants from Berbera and Zeila, which was procured from Harar and the Abyssinian interior. According to Captain Haines, who was the colonial administrator of Aden (1839–1854), Mocha historically imported up to two-thirds of their coffee from Berbera-based merchants before the coffee trade of Mocha was captured by British-controlled Aden in the 19th century. Thereafter, much of the Ethiopian coffee was exported to Aden via Berbera.

Middle East 
Sufis in Yemen used the beverage as an aid to concentration and as a kind of spiritual intoxication when they chanted the name of God. Sufis used it to keep themselves alert during their nighttime devotions. A translation of Al-Jaziri's manuscript traces the spread of coffee from Arabia Felix (present-day Yemen) northward to Mecca and Medina, and then to the larger cities of Cairo, Damascus, Baghdad, and Constantinople.

By 1414, the plant was known in Mecca, and in the early 1500s was spreading to the Mameluke Sultanate of Egypt and North Africa from the Yemeni port of Mocha. Associated with Sufism, myriad coffee houses grew up in Cairo (Egypt) around the religious University of the Azhar. These coffee houses also opened in Syria, especially in the cosmopolitan city of Aleppo, and then in Istanbul, the capital of the Ottoman Empire, in 1554. Coffee was also noted in Aleppo by the German physician botanist Leonhard Rauwolf, the first European to mention it, as chaube, in 1573; Rauwolf was closely followed by descriptions from other European travellers.

In 1511, it was forbidden for its stimulating effect by conservative, orthodox imams at a theological court in Mecca. However, these bans were to be overturned in 1524 by an order of the Ottoman Turkish Sultan Suleiman I, with Grand Mufti Mehmet Ebussuud el-İmadi issuing a fatwa allowing the consumption of coffee. In Cairo a similar ban was instituted in 1532, and the coffeehouses and warehouses containing coffee beans were sacked. During the 16th century, it had already reached the rest of the Middle East, the Safavid Empire and the Ottoman Empire. From the Middle East, coffee drinking spread to Italy, then to the rest of Europe, and coffee plants were transported by the Dutch to the East Indies and to the Americas.

In the Middle East, coffee culture is very significant. Different ethnic groups in the Middle East have their own version of preparing and serving the coffee. Since the modern coffee culture is still continuously growing, coffee in the Middle East is used to bring people together and is seen at every social gathering.

Coffee regulation in Ethiopia 
Coffee was banned by the Ethiopian Orthodox Church sometime before the 18th century. However, in the second half of the 19th century, Ethiopian attitudes softened towards coffee drinking, and its consumption spread rapidly between 1880 and 1886; according to Richard Pankhurst, "this was largely due to Emperor Menelik, who himself drank it, and to Abuna Matewos who did much to dispel the belief of the clergy that it was a Muslim drink."

The earliest mention of coffee noted by the literary coffee merchant Philippe Sylvestre Dufour is a reference to bunchum in the works of the 10th century CE Persian physician Muhammad ibn Zakariya al-Razi, known as Rhazes in the West, but more definite information on the preparation of a beverage from the roasted coffee berries dates from several centuries later. One of the most important of the early writers on coffee was Abd al-Qadir al-Jaziri, who in 1587 compiled a work tracing the history and legal controversies of coffee entitled Umdat al Safwa fi hill al-qahwa عمدة الصفوة في حل القهوة. He reported that one Sheikh, Jamal-al-Din al-Dhabhani (d. 1470), mufti of Aden, was the first to adopt the use of coffee (circa 1454).

Coffee in Islam 
Early practitioners of Islamic medicine and science fought against the notion that the effect of coffee was like that of hashish or alcohol, and instead argued the benefits of the drink, which would stimulate the mind while protecting against the allure of alcohol and hashish. Coffeehouses in Mecca, Yemen, and Cairo began to explode in popularity, and they become centers of public life within the sprawling cities of the Islamicate Empires. The coffeehouses sometimes acted like the bayt al-Hakima or madrasas, which were centers of Islamic life, arts, and thinking. Neha Verami, from the Folger Shakespeare Library, said that "the history of these coffeehouses offers three connected insights: the emergence of the public sphere, the participation of larger sections of the population in the political lives of the early modern Islamic empires, and the hollowness of the allegations of despotism mounted on ‘Oriental’ societies by Western onlookers". Coffee became an ingrained piece of Islamic culture for the centuries to come.

Contrary to its role in recent centuries, coffee became a subject of debate for some. When the fatwa came into effect in 1532–1533, coffee and its consumption was established as haram. This decision most likely came from the idea that like alcohol, coffee had an effect on cognition, albeit different and milder. It is possible that the regulation was implemented in an attempt to limit consumption of other recreational substances such as tobacco and alcohol in the Ottoman and Safavid Empires. Drinking coffee in public places was also scorned. Not only was public consumption seen as taboo, but people would often drink from a communal bowl in a fashion similar to drinking wine. This most likely contributed to the disdain of coffee because its similar style of consumption once again related it and compared it to alcohol.

An effort was made to prevent the spread of coffee's growing popularity. While Suleiman I was still in power, taxes were imposed in an attempt to prevent both bureaucrats and those who were unemployed from consuming coffee. Further attempts occurred during both the reigns of Sultan Selim II in 1567 as well as Sultan Murad III in 1583 whenever those of more modest means began to drink coffee which included professions ranging from craftsmen to shopkeepers to local soldiers. Despite the attempt to bar people from drinking coffee, the fatwa ultimately failed as coffee did not compare to the effects of alcohol. That coffee was even seen as a mind-altering substance like alcohol meant that the prohibition was more of a misunderstanding of the substance or an attempt to control consumption based on Orthodox beliefs. This back-and-forth scenario falls within the debate of whether coffee is halal or haram. While it certainly proved controversial, coffee continued to be sought out by many.

Within the Ottoman Empire, shops known as taḥmīskhāne in Ottoman Turkish were used to create coffee using the traditional method of roasting and crushing coffee beans in mortars. Coffee houses located in areas such as Mecca were visited by those from all over: Muslims from mosques, those coming from afar to trade and sell, or simple travelers making their way through.

Despite the controversy over coffee, it was one of the keys to the economy around the Red Sea from the mid-15th century to the mid-17th century. Those of Islam were the primary consumers, ingraining it into the culture of the people within the Muslim faith. From Islam, the rest of the world would go on to experience something that holds influence over the world today. In the past, the Oromo tribe in Ethiopia created foods from coffee plants such as bunna qela, made of butter, salt, and roasted beans. Such a concoction would be used as a basis and altered over time. A more modern beverage known as qishr in Arabic is made of recycled dried cherry skins that would have normally been discarded after being used to create the beverage buna. These cherry skins would then be used to brew a sort of fruit tea. Qishr or cascara in Spanish is sold by coffee farmers even today.

Legendary accounts 
There are several legendary accounts of the origin of the consumption of coffee. According to one legend, ancestors of today's Kafficho people in the Kingdom of Kaffa were the first to recognize the energizing effect of the coffee plant. One account involves a 9th-century Ethiopian goatherder, Kaldi, who, noticing the energizing effects when his flock nibbled on the bright red berries of a certain bush, chewed on the fruit himself. His exhilaration prompted him to bring the berries to a monk in a nearby monastery. But the monk disapproved of their use and threw them into the fire, from which an enticing aroma billowed, causing other monks to come and investigate. The roasted beans were quickly raked from the embers, ground up, and dissolved in hot water, yielding the world's first cup of coffee. Since this story is not known to have appeared in writing before Rome-based Maronite Faustus Nairon's De Saluberrima potione Cahue seu Cafe nuncupata Discurscus in 1671, 800 years after it was supposed to have taken place, it is highly likely to be apocryphal.

Another account involves the 13th century Moroccan Sufi mystic Ghothul Akbar Nooruddin Abu al-Hasan al-Shadhili. When traveling in Ethiopia, the legend goes, he observed birds of unusual vitality feeding on berries, and, upon trying the berries, experienced the same vitality. Yet another attributes the discovery of coffee to Sheikh Abu al-Hasan ash-Shadhili's disciple, Omar. According to the ancient chronicle (preserved in the Abd-Al-Kadir manuscript), Omar, who was known for his ability to cure the sick through prayer, was once banished from Mecca to a desert cave near the Ousab City. Starving, Omar chewed berries from nearby shrubbery, but found them to be too bitter. He tried roasting the beans to improve the flavor, but they became too hard. He then tried boiling them to soften the bean, which resulted in a fragrant brown liquid. After drinking the liquid, Omar was revived and survived for days. As stories of this "miracle drug" reached Mecca, Omar was asked to return and was eventually made a saint.

Another origin of coffee was described in Homer's Odyssey. At one point in the Epic, Helena, daughter of Zeus, mixes a drink in a bowl "which had the power of robbing grief and anger of their sting and banishing all painful memories." The Greek gods apparently used coffee for medicinal and spiritual purposes while they lounged at Mount Olympus. 

Coffee was originally consumed in the Islamic world and was directly related to religious practices. For example, coffee helped its consumers fast in the day and stay awake at night, during the Muslim celebration of Ramadan.

Europe

Coffee was first introduced to Europe in Hungary when the Turks invaded Hungary at the Battle of Mohács in 1526.  Within a year, coffee had reached Vienna by the same Turks who fought the Europeans at the Siege of Vienna (1529).  Later in the 16th century, coffee was introduced on the island of Malta through slavery. Turkish Muslim slaves had been imprisoned by the Knights of St John in 1565—the year of the Great Siege of Malta, and they used them to make their traditional beverage. Domenico Magri mentioned in his work Virtu del Kafé, "Turks, most skillful makers of this concoction." Also, the German traveler Gustav Sommerfeldt in 1663 wrote 
"the ability and industriousness with which the Turkish prisoners earn some money, especially by preparing coffee, a powder resembling snuff tobacco, with water and sugar." Coffee was a popular beverage in Maltese high society—many coffee shops opened.

The first mention of coffee in a European text is in Charles de l'Ecluse's  from 1575. He learnt of coffee from Alphoncius Pansius in Padua. Englishmen passing through Safavid and the Ottoman Empire in the late 16th century noted that coffee was "very good to help digestion, to quicken the spirits, and to cleanse the blood.”

The vibrant trade between the Republic of Venice and the people of North Africa, Egypt, and the East brought a large variety of African goods, including coffee, to this leading European port. Venetian merchants introduced coffee-drinking to the wealthy in Venice, charging them heavily for the beverage. In this way, coffee was introduced to the mainland of Europe. In 1591 Venetian botanist-physician Prospero Alpini became the first to publish a description of the coffee plant in Europe. The first European coffee house apart from those in the Ottoman Empire and in Malta was opened in Venice in 1645. 

The first route of travel for coffee was through the massive, sprawling Ottoman Empire that allowed transportation of goods such as coffee to make their way well into Europe, and the second route of travel was from the port of Mocha in Yemen, where the East India Trading Co. bought coffee in masses and transported it back to mainland Europe. Coffee became a crucial part of the culture in most of Europe, with queens, kings, and the general public all becoming extensively enthralled with the product. Rather it be through the term 'coffee arabica' or the transportation of the drink, the passage of coffee into the Western world greatly resembles that of the scientific knowledge and discoveries passed on by the Islamicate Empires.

Austria

The first coffeehouse in Austria opened in Vienna in 1683 after the Battle of Vienna, by using supplies from the spoils obtained after defeating the Turks. The officer who received the coffee beans, Jerzy Franciszek Kulczycki (Georg Franz Kolschitzky), a Polish military officer of Ukrainian descent, opened a coffee house and helped popularize the custom of adding sugar and milk to the coffee. Melange is the typical Viennese coffee, which comes mixed with hot foamed milk, and is usually served with a glass of water.

A very special Viennese coffee house culture developed in Vienna in the 19th century and then spread throughout Central Europe. Scientists, artists, intellectuals, bon vivants and their financiers met in this special microcosm of the Viennese coffee houses of the Habsburg Empire. Today world-famous personalities such as Gustav Klimt, Sigmund Freud, James Joyce and Egon Schiele were inspired in the Viennese coffee house. This special multicultural atmosphere and culture was largely destroyed by the later National Socialism and Communism and only survived in individual places such as Vienna or Trieste. In this diverse coffee house culture of the multicultural Habsburg Empire, different types of coffee preparation also developed. This is how the world-famous cappuccino from the Viennese Kapuziner coffee developed over the Italian-speaking parts of the northern Italian empire.

United Kingdom

The first coffeehouse in England was opened in St. Michael's Alley in Cornhill, London. The proprietor was Pasqua Rosée, the servant of Daniel Edwards, a trader in Turkish goods. Edwards imported the coffee and assisted Rosée in setting up the establishment. Coffee was also brought in through the British East India Company and the Dutch East India Company in the 17th century. Oxford's Queen's Lane Coffee House, established in 1654, is still in existence today. By 1675, there were more than 3,000 coffeehouses throughout England, but there were many disruptions in the progressive movement of coffeehouses between the 1660s and 1670s. During the enlightenment, these early English coffee houses became gathering places used for deep religious and political discussions among the populace, since it was a rare opportunity for sober discussion. This practice became so common, and potentially subversive, that Charles II made an attempt to crush coffee houses in 1670s.

The banning of women from coffeehouses was not universal, for example, women frequented them in Germany, but it appears to have been commonplace elsewhere in Europe, including in England.

Many in this period believed coffee to have medicinal properties. Renowned and eminent physicians often recommended coffee for medicinal purposes and some prescribed it as a cure for nervous disorders. A 1661 tract entitled "A character of coffee and coffee-houses", written by one "M.P.", lists some of these perceived benefits:

This new commodity proved controversial among some subjects, however. For instance, the anonymous 1674 "Women's Petition Against Coffee" declared:

France
Antoine Galland (1646–1715) in his aforementioned translation described the Muslim association with coffee, tea and chocolate: "We are indebted to these great [Arab] physicians for introducing coffee to the modern world through their writings, as well as sugar, tea, and chocolate." Galland reported that he was informed by Mr. de la Croix, the interpreter of King Louis XIV of France, that coffee was brought to Paris by a certain Mr. Thevenot, who had travelled through the East. On his return to that city in 1657, Thevenot gave some of the beans to his friends, one of whom was de la Croix.

In 1669, Soleiman Agha, Ambassador from Sultan Mehmed IV, arrived in Paris with his entourage bringing with him a large quantity of coffee beans. Not only did they provide their French and European guests with coffee to drink, but they also donated some beans to the royal court. Between July 1669 and May 1670, the Ambassador managed to firmly establish the custom of drinking coffee among Parisians.

Germany
In Germany, coffeehouses were first established in North Sea ports, including Wuppertal-Ronsdorf (1673) and Hamburg (1677). Initially, this new beverage was written in the English form coffee, but during the 1700s the Germans gradually adopted the French word café, then slowly changed the spelling to Kaffee, which is the present word. In the 18th century the popularity of coffee gradually spread around the German lands and was taken up by the ruling classes. Coffee was served at the court of the Great Elector, Frederick William of Brandenburg, as early as 1675, but Berlin's first public coffee house did not open until 1721.

Composer Johann Sebastian Bach, who was cantor of St. Thomas Church in Leipzig, in 1723–50, conducted a musical ensemble at the local Café Zimmermann. Sometime in 1732–35 he composed the secular "Coffee Cantata" Schweigt stille, plaudert nicht (BWV 211), in which a young woman, Lieschen, pleads with her disapproving father to accept her devotion to drinking coffee, then a newfangled fashion. The libretto includes such lines as:

Ei! wie schmeckt der Coffee süße,
Lieblicher als tausend Küsse,
Milder als Muskatenwein.
Coffee, Coffee muss ich haben,
Und wenn jemand mich will laben,
Ach, so schenkt mir Coffee ein!

(Oh! How sweet coffee does taste,
Better than a thousand kisses,
Milder than muscat wine.
Coffee, coffee, I've got to have it,
And if someone wants to perk me up, *
Oh, just give me a cup of coffee!)

Italy 

In Italy, like in most of Europe, coffee arrived in the second half of the 16th century through the commercial routes of the Mediterranean Sea. In 1580 the Venetian botanist and physician Prospero Alpini imported coffee into the Republic of Venice from Egypt, and soon coffee shops started opening one by one when coffee spread and became the drink of the intellectuals, of social gatherings, even of lovers as plates of chocolate and coffee were considered a romantic gift. By the year 1763 Venice alone accounted for more than 200 shops, and the health benefits of the miraculous drink were celebrated by many. Some representatives of the Catholic Church opposed coffee at its first introduction in Italy, believing it to be the "Devil's drink", but Pope Clement VIII, after trying the aromatic drink himself, gave it his blessing, thus boosting further its commercial success and diffusion. Upon tasting coffee, Pope Clement VIII declared: "Why, this Satan's drink is so delicious that it would be a pity to let the infidels have exclusive use of it. We shall cheat satan by baptizing it." He later on baptized coffee beans because it appeared better for the people than alcoholic beverages.

In Turin, in 1933, Alfonso Bialetti invented the first moka pot by observing the lisciveuse, a steam pot utilized at that time for laundry. In 1946 his son Renato started industrial production, selling millions of moka pots in one year, versus only 70000 sold by his father in the previous 10, making the coffee maker (as well as coffee) an icon of Italy in the world. Naples, albeit being known today as the city of coffee, has seen it later, probably through the ships coming in the ports of Sicily and Naples itself. Some date the Neapolitan discovery of coffee back to 1614, when the composer, explorer and musicologist Pietro Della Valle sent news from the Holy Land, in his letters to the dear friend, physician, poet, Greek scholar and Mario Schipano and his gathering of intellectuals, of a drink (called kahve) the Arab Muslims brewed in hot pots.

Some believe coffee arrived in Naples earlier, from Salerno and its Schola Medica Salernitana, where the plant came to be used for its medicinal properties between the 14th and 15th centuries. Celebrated by Neapolitan art, literature, music and daily social life, coffee soon became a protagonist in Naples, where it was prepared with great care in the "cuccumella", the typical Neapolitan filter coffee pot derived by the invention of the parisian Morize in 1819. Neapolitan artisans came in touch with it when brought, once again through the sea commercial routes, to the Port of Naples. An indication of the approach of Neapolitans to coffee as a social drink, is the practice of the suspended coffee (the act of paying in advance for a coffee to be consumed by the next customer) invented there and defined by the Neapolitan philosopher and writer Luciano De Crescenzo a coffee "given by an individual to mankind".

Netherlands

The race among Europeans to obtain live coffee trees or beans was eventually won by the Dutch in 1616. Pieter van den Broecke, a Dutch merchant, obtained some of the closely guarded coffee bushes from Mocha, Yemen, in 1616. He took them back to Amsterdam and found a home for them in the Botanical gardens, where they began to thrive. This apparently minor event received little publicity but was to have a major impact on the history of coffee.

The beans that van der Broecke acquired from Mocha forty years earlier adjusted well to conditions in the greenhouses at the Amsterdam Botanical Garden and produced numerous healthy Coffea arabica bushes. In 1658 the Dutch first used them to begin coffee cultivation in Ceylon (now Sri Lanka) and later in southern India. They abandoned this cultivation to focus on their Javanese plantations in order to avoid lowering the price by oversupply.

Within a few years, the Dutch colonies (Java in Asia, Suriname in the Americas) had become the main suppliers of coffee to Europe.

Poland

Coffee reached the Polish–Lithuanian Commonwealth in the 17th century, primarily through merchants trading with the neighbouring Ottoman Empire. The first coffee shops opened a century later. The intake of coffee has grown since the change of government in 1989, though consumption per capita is lower than in most European countries. Poland also developed its own substitute to coffee, Inka, made from roasted cereal.

Americas

Gabriel de Clieu brought coffee seedlings to Martinique in the Caribbean in 1720. Those sprouts flourished and 50 years later there were 18,680 coffee trees in Martinique enabling the spread of coffee cultivation to Saint-Domingue (Haiti), Mexico and other islands of the Caribbean. The French territory of Saint-Domingue saw coffee cultivated starting in 1734, and by 1788 supplied half the world's coffee. Coffee had a major influence on the geography of Latin America. The French colonial plantations relied heavily on African slave laborers. However, the dreadful conditions that the slaves worked in on coffee plantations were a factor in the soon-to-follow Haitian Revolution. The coffee industry never fully recovered there.

Coffee also found its way to the Isle of Bourbon, now known as Réunion, in the Indian Ocean. The plant produced smaller beans and was deemed a different variety of arabica known as var. Bourbon. The Santos coffee of Brazil and the Oaxaca coffee of Mexico are the progeny of that Bourbon tree. Circa 1727, the King of Portugal sent Francisco de Melo Palheta to French Guiana to obtain coffee seeds to become a part of the coffee market. Francisco initially had difficulty obtaining these seeds, but he captivated the French Governor's wife, and she sent him enough seeds and shoots to commence the coffee industry of Brazil. However, cultivation did not gather momentum until independence in 1822, leading to the clearing of massive tracts of the Atlantic Forest, first from the vicinity of Rio and later São Paulo for coffee plantations.
In 1893, the coffee from Brazil was introduced into Kenya and Tanzania (Tanganyika), not far from its place of origin in Ethiopia, 600 years prior, ending its transcontinental journey.

After the Boston Tea Party of 1773, large numbers of Americans switched to drinking coffee during the American Revolution because drinking tea had become unpatriotic.

Cultivation was taken up by many countries in the latter half of the 19th century, and in almost all of them it involved the large-scale displacement and exploitation of indigenous people. Harsh conditions led to many uprisings, coups and bloody suppressions of peasants. For example, Guatemala started producing coffee in the 1500s but lacked the manpower to harvest the coffee beans. As a result, the Guatemalan government forced indigenous people to work on the fields. This led to a strain in the indigenous and Guatemalan people's relationship that still exists today. A notable exception is Costa Rica where a lack of ready labor prevented the formation of large farms. Smaller farms and more egalitarian conditions ameliorated unrest over the 19th and 20th centuries.

In the 20th century Latin American countries faced a possible economic collapse. Before World War II Europe was consuming large amounts of coffee. Once the war started Latin America lost 40% of its market and was on the verge of economic collapse. Coffee was and is a Latin American commodity. The United States saw this and talked with the Latin American countries and as a result the producers agreed on an equitable division of the U.S. market. The U.S. government monitored this agreement. For the period that this plan was followed the value of coffee doubled, which greatly benefited coffee producers and the Latin American countries.

Brazil became the largest producer of coffee in the world by 1852 and it has held that status ever since. It dominated world production, exporting more coffee than the rest of the world combined, from 1850 to 1950. The period since 1950 saw the widening of the playing field due to the emergence of several other major producers, notably Colombia, Ivory Coast, Ethiopia, and, most recently, Vietnam, which overtook Colombia and became the second-largest producer in 1999 and reached 15% market share by 2011.

A recent change to the coffee market are lattes, Frappuccinos and other sugary coffee drinks. This has caused coffee houses to be able to use cheaper coffee beans in their coffee. The cheaper coffee beans are called Robusta and they contain more caffeine than expensive beans. This makes them more popular as well. The producers, however, receive less money for the production of cheaper beans, than they do for the production of higher quality beans. Since the producers get paid less, they are receiving a smaller income, which in turn hurts the economy of Latin America.

Asia
During the cultivation, brewed coffee was reserved exclusively for the priesthood and the medical profession; doctors would use the brew for patients experiencing a need for better digestion, and priests used it to stay alert during their long nights of studying for the church.

India

Coffee came to India well before the East India company, through an India Sufi saint named "Baba Budan". The first record of coffee growing in India is following the introduction of coffee beans from Yemen by Baba Budan to the hills of Chikmagalur, Karnataka, in 1670. Since then coffee plantations have become established in the region, extending south to Kodagu.

Coffee production in India is dominated in the hill tracts of South Indian states, with the state of Karnataka accounting 53% followed by Kerala 28% and Tamil Nadu 11% of production of 8,200 Tonnes. Indian coffee is said to be the finest coffee grown in the shade rather than direct sunlight anywhere in the world. There are approximately 250,000 coffee growers in India; 98% of them are small growers. As of 2009, the production of coffee in India was only 4.5% of the total production in the world. Almost 80% of the country's coffee production is exported. Of that which is exported, 70% is bound for Germany, Russian federation, Spain, Belgium, Slovenia, United States, Japan, Greece, Netherlands and France, and Italy accounts for 29% of the exports. Most of the export is shipped through the Suez Canal.

Coffee is grown in three regions of India with Karnataka, Kerala and Tamil Nadu forming the traditional coffee growing region of South India, followed by the new areas developed in the non-traditional areas of Andhra Pradesh and Orissa in the eastern coast of the country and with a third region comprising the states of Assam, Manipur, Meghalaya, Mizoram, Tripura, Nagaland and Arunachal Pradesh of Northeastern India, popularly known as "Seven Sister States of India".

Indian coffee, grown mostly in southern India under monsoon rainfall conditions, is also termed as "Indian monsooned coffee". Its flavour is defined as: "The best Indian coffee reaches the flavour characteristics of Pacific coffees, but at its worst it is simply bland and uninspiring". The two well-known species of coffee grown are the Arabica and Robusta. The first variety that was introduced in the Baba Budan Giri hill ranges of Karnataka in the 17th century was marketed over the years under the brand names of Kent and S.795. Coffee is served in a distinctive drip-style "filter coffee" across Southern India.

Chikmagalur 
Coffee is the cornerstone of Chikmagalur's economy. Chikmagalur is the birthplace of coffee in India, where the seed was first sown about 350 years ago. 
Coffee Board is the department located in Chikmagalur town that oversees the production and marketing of coffee cultivated in the district. Coffee is cultivated in Chikmagalur district in an area of around 85,465 hectares with Arabica being the dominant variety grown in upper hills and Robusta being the major variety in the low-level hills. There are around 15000 coffee growers in this district with 96% of them being small growers with holdings of less than or equal to 4 hectares. The average production is 55,000 MT: 35,000 MT of Arabica and 20,000 MT of Robusta. The average productivity per hectare is 810 kg for Arabica and 1110 kg of Robusta, which are higher than the national average. Arabica is a species of coffee that is also known as the "coffee shrub of Arabia", "mountain coffee" or "arabica coffee". Coffea arabica is believed to be the first species of coffee to be cultivated, being grown in southwest Arabia for well over 1,000 years. It is considered to produce better coffee than the other major commercially grown coffee species, Coffea canephora (Robusta). Arabica contains less caffeine than any other commercially cultivated species of coffee. 
Robusta is a species of coffee which has its origins in western Africa. It is grown mostly in Africa and Brazil, where it is often called Conillon. It is also grown in Southeast Asia where French colonists introduced it in the late 19th century. In recent years Vietnam, which only produces Robusta, has surpassed Brazil, India, and Indonesia to become the world's single largest exporter. Approximately one third of the coffee produced in the world is Robusta.

Japan

Coffee was introduced to Japan by the Dutch in the 17th century but remained a curiosity until the lifting of trade restrictions in 1858. The first European-style coffeehouse opened in Tokyo in 1888 and closed four years later. By the early 1930s there were over 30,000 coffeehouses across the country; availability in the wartime and immediate postwar period dropped to nearly zero, then rapidly increased as import barriers were removed. The introduction of freeze-dried instant coffee, canned coffee, and franchises such as Starbucks and Doutor Coffee in the late 20th century continued this trend, to the point that Japan is now one of the leading per capita coffee consumers in the world.

South Korea
Coffee's first notable Korean enthusiasts were 19th century emperors Sunjong and Gojong, who preferred to consume it after western-style banquets. By the 1980s instant coffee and canned coffee had become fairly popular, with a more minor tradition of independently owned coffeehouses in larger cities; toward the end of the century the growth of franchises such as Caffe Bene and Starbucks brought about a greater demand for European-style coffee.

Indonesia

Coffee was first introduced by the Dutch during colonization in the late 17th century. After several years coffee was planted on Indonesia Archipelago. Many coffee specialties are from the Indonesian Archipelago. The colloquial name for coffee, Java, comes from the time when most of Europe and America's coffee was grown in Java. Today Indonesia is one of the largest coffee producers in the world, mainly for export. However, coffee is enjoyed in various ways around the archipelago, for example, the traditional "kopi tubruk".

Philippines

The Philippines is one of the few countries that produces the four varieties of commercially viable coffee: Arabica, Liberica (Barako), Excelsa and Robusta. Climatic and soil conditions in the Philippines—from the lowland to mountain regions—make the country suitable for all four varieties.

In the Philippines, coffee has a history as rich as its flavor. The first coffee tree was introduced in Lipa, Batangas in 1740 by a Spanish Franciscan friar. From there, coffee growing spread to other parts of Batangas like Ibaan, Lemery, San Jose, Taal, and Tanauan. Batangas owed much of its wealth to the coffee plantations in these areas and Lipa eventually became the coffee capital of the Philippines.

By the 1860s, Batangas was exporting coffee to America through San Francisco. When the Suez Canal was opened, a new market started in Europe as well. Seeing the success of the Batangeños, Cavite followed suit by growing the first coffee seedlings in 1876 in Amadeo. In spite of this, Lipa still reigned as the center for coffee production in the Philippines and Batangas barako was commanding five times the price of other Asian coffee beans. In 1880, the Philippines was the fourth largest exporter of coffee beans, and when the coffee rust hit Brazil, Africa, and Java, it became the only source of coffee beans worldwide.

The glory days of the Philippine coffee industry lasted until 1889 when coffee rust hit the Philippine shores. That, coupled with an insect infestation, destroyed virtually all the coffee trees in Batangas. Since Batangas was a major producer of coffee, this greatly affected national coffee production. In two years, coffee production was reduced to 1/6th its original amount. By then, Brazil had regained its position as the world's leading producer of coffee. A few of the surviving coffee seedlings were transferred from Batangas to Cavite, where they flourished. This was not the end of the Philippines' coffee growing days, but there was less area allotted to coffee because many farmers had shifted to other crops.

During the 1950s, the Philippine government, with the help of the Americans, brought in a more resistant variety of coffee. It was also then that instant coffee was being produced commercially, thus increasing the demand for beans. Because of favorable market conditions, many farmers went back to growing coffee in the 1960s. But the sudden proliferation of coffee farms resulted in a surplus of beans around the world, and for a while importation of coffee was banned in order to protect local coffee producers. When Brazil was hit by a frost in the 1970s, world market coffee prices soared. The Philippines became a member of the International Coffee Organization (ICO) in 1980.

Vietnam

Vietnam is one of the world's main coffee exporters (according to 2005 statistics). Arabica is the first imported coffee variety to Vietnam since 1857. The first is the trial planting in the northern provinces such as Ha Nam, Phu Ly, then expanding to provinces like Thanh Hoa, Nghe An, Ha Tinh. Then spread to the central provinces. Finally, coffee grows in the Central Highlands, and it is recognized that the Central Highlands is a good place to grow coffee.

In 1908, France imported two coffee varieties—Robusta and Liberica. After a while, the French colonialists found that coffee arabica was not effective, so it brought Congo coffee into the Central Highlands. Here, coffee trees grow very strongly. And the Central Highlands became the largest coffee growing area in the country, famous in the world, especially coffee "Buon Me Thuoc".

Coffee of Trung Nguyen is a No. 1 coffee brand in Vietnam and has exported to over 60 countries around the world. It was founded in 1996 Dang Le Nguyen Vu.

Production

The first step in Europeans' wresting the means of production was effected by Nicolaes Witsen, the enterprising burgomaster of Amsterdam and member of the governing board of the Dutch East India Company who urged Joan van Hoorn, the Dutch governor at Batavia that some coffee plants be obtained at the export port of Mocha in Yemen, the source of Europe's supply, and established in the Dutch East Indies; the project of raising many plants from the seeds of the first shipment met with such success that the Dutch East India Company was able to supply Europe's demand with "Java coffee" by 1719. Encouraged by their success, they soon had coffee plantations in Ceylon, Sumatra and other Sunda islands. Coffee trees were soon grown under glass at the Hortus Botanicus of Leiden, whence slips were generously extended to other botanical gardens. Dutch representatives at the negotiations that led to the Treaty of Utrecht presented their French counterparts with a coffee plant, which was grown on at the Jardin du Roi, predecessor of the Jardin des Plantes, in Paris.

The introduction of coffee to the Americas was effected by Captain Gabriel des Clieux, who obtained cuttings from the reluctant botanist Antoine de Jussieu, who was loath to disfigure the king's coffee tree. Clieux, when water rations dwindled during a difficult voyage, shared his portion with his precious plants and protected them from a Dutchman, perhaps an agent of the Provinces jealous of the Batavian trade. Clieux nurtured the plants on his arrival in the West Indies, and established them in Guadeloupe and Saint-Domingue in addition to Martinique, where a blight had struck the cacao plantations, which were replaced by coffee plantations in a space of three years, is attributed to France through its colonization of many parts of the continent starting with the Martinique and the colonies of the West Indies where the first French coffee plantations were founded.

The first coffee plantation in Brazil occurred in 1727 when Lt. Col. Francisco de Melo Palheta smuggled seeds, still essentially from the germ plasm originally taken from Yemen to Batavia, from French Guiana. By the 1800s, Brazil's harvests would turn coffee from an elite indulgence to a drink for the masses. Brazil, which like most other countries cultivates coffee as a commercial commodity, relied heavily on slave labor from Africa for the viability of the plantations until the abolition of slavery in 1888. The success of coffee in 17th-century Europe was paralleled with the spread of the habit of tobacco smoking all over the continent during the course of the Thirty Years' War (1618–1648).

For many decades in the 19th and early 20th centuries, Brazil was the biggest producer of coffee and a virtual monopolist in the trade. However, a policy of maintaining high prices soon opened opportunities to other nations, such as Venezuela, Colombia, Guatemala, Nicaragua, Indonesia and Vietnam, now second only to Brazil as the major coffee producer in the world. Large-scale production in Vietnam began following normalization of trade relations with the US in 1995. Nearly all of the coffee grown there is Robusta.

Despite the origins of coffee cultivation in Ethiopia, that country produced only a small amount for export until the twentieth century, and much of that not from the south of the country but from the environs of Harar in the northeast. The Kingdom of Kaffa, home of the plant, was estimated to produce between 50,000 and 60,000 kilograms of coffee beans in the 1880s. Commercial production effectively began in 1907 with the founding of the inland port of Gambela. 100,000 kilograms of coffee was exported from Gambela in 1908, while in 1927–28 over 4 million kilograms passed through that port. Coffee plantations were also developed in Arsi Province at the same time and were eventually exported by means of the Addis Ababa – Djibouti Railway. While only 245,000 kilograms were freighted by the Railway, this amount jumped to 2,240,000 kilograms by 1922, surpassed exports of "Harari" coffee by 1925, and reached 9,260,000 kilograms in 1936.

Australia is a minor coffee producer, with little product for export, but its coffee history goes back to 1880 when the first of  began to be developed in an area between northern New South Wales and Cooktown. Today there are several producers of Arabica coffee in Australia that use a mechanical harvesting system invented in 1981.

See also

Anacafé
Economics of coffee
Federación Nacional de Cafeteros de Colombia
International Coffee Agreement
National Coffee Association
Specialty Coffee Association of America

References

Further reading

1949 Encyclopædia Britannica. Otis, McAllister & Co. 1954
Allen, Stewart Lee (1999). The Devil's Cup: Coffee, the Driving Force in History. Soho Press.
Birsel, Salâh. – Kahveler kitabı. – 1. baskı. – Istanbul : Koza Yayınları, 1975. – (Olaylar-belgeler-anılar; 8).
Burn, Jacob Henry, d. (1869). A descriptive catalogue of the London traders, tavern, and coffee-house toke. 2nd ed. London.
Chew, Samual C (1974). The Crescent and the Rose. Oxford University Press, New York.
Darby, M. (1983) The Islamic Perspective, An aspect of British Architecture and Design in the 19th century. Leighton House Gallery, London.
Davids, Kenneth (1991). Coffee.
De Crescenzo, Luciano (2008). Il caffè sospeso. Arnoldo Mondadori Editore, Milan.
Ellis, Aytoun (1956). The Penny Universities : A History of the Coffee-Houses. London: Secker & Warburg.
Galland, Antoine (1699) De l'origine et du progrez du café, Éd. originale J. Cavelier Paris, 1992– La Bibliothèque, coll. L'Écrivain Voyageur
Johannessen, Silje, and Harold Wilhite. "Who Really Benefits from Fairtrade? An Analysis of Value Distribution in Fairtrade Coffee." Globalizations 7, no. 4 (December 2010): 525–544. 
 
 Liss, David. The Coffee Trader (2003). A well-researched historical novel about (among other things) the beginnings of the coffee business in 17th century Amsterdam. Includes extensive bibliography.
"Fairtrade is not fair," YouTube Video, 09:33, Why Fair Trade is Bad on December 01, 2009, posted by "Peter Griffiths," October 5, 2017. 
McCreery, David. "Coffee and Indigenous Labor in Guatemala, 1871–1980." In The Global Coffee Economy in Africa, Asia and Latin America, 1500–1989. Cambridge: Cambridge University Press, 2003. pp 192–208. 

Topik, Steven C. "Coffee Anyone? Recent Research on Latin American Coffee Societies." Hispanic American Historical Review 80, no. 2 (May 2000): 225–266. Humanities International Complete, EBSCOhost (accessed September 27, 2017).

 Withington, Phil. "Public and Private Pleasures." History Today (June 2020) 70#6 pp 16-18. covers London 1630 to 1800.
 Withington, Phil. "Where was the coffee in early modern England?." Journal of Modern History 92.1 (2020): 40–75.

External links
 A History of the World in 6 Glasses, by Tom Standage: a review by blaqswans.org
 Dorothee Wierling: Coffee during the World War I, in: 1914-1918-online. International Encyclopedia of the First World War.

 
Coffee